Club Unión Deportivo Parachique (sometimes referred as UDP) is a Peruvian football club, playing in the city of Sechura, Piura, Peru.

History
The Club Unión Deportivo Parachique was founded on February 2, 1962.

In the 2015 Copa Perú, the club classified to the Departamental Stage, but was eliminated by La Bocana in the Semifinals.

In the 2018 Copa Perú, the club classified to the National Stage, but was eliminated when finished in 28th place.

In the 2021 Copa Perú, the club classified to the National Stage, but was eliminated when finished in 7th place.

Honours

Regional
Liga Departamental de Piura:
Runner-up (1): 2018

Liga Provincial de Sechura:
Winners (3): 2015, 2017, 2018

Liga Distrital de Sechura:
Winners (4): 2015, 2016, 2017, 2018
Runner-up (2): 2014, 2019

See also
List of football clubs in Peru
Peruvian football league system

References

External links
Soccerway 

Football clubs in Peru
Association football clubs established in 1962
1962 establishments in Peru